is a railway station on the Tobu Urban Park Line in Nagareyama, Chiba Japan, operated by the private railway operator Tobu Railway.

Lines
It is 33.2 kilometers from the western terminus of the line at Ōmiya.

Station layout
Unga Station has one island platform and one side platform serving three tracks. The station building was rebuilt as a new overhead station, completed during fiscal 2013.

Platforms

Adjacent stations

History
Unga Station opened on 9 May 1911. From 17 March 2012, station numbering was introduced on the Tobu Noda Line, with Unga Station becoming "TD-19".

Passenger statistics
In fiscal 2014, the station was used by an average of 21,132 passengers daily.

Surrounding area
Tokyo University of Science

See also
 List of railway stations in Japan

References

External links

 Tobu Railway Station information 

Railway stations in Chiba Prefecture
Railway stations in Japan opened in 1911
Tobu Noda Line
Stations of Tobu Railway